Pratapsinh Mohite-Patil (1955–2018) was an Indian politician and member of the Bharatiya Janata Party. Mohite-Patil was a member of the Maharashtra Legislative Assembly. He won Solapur (Lok Sabha constituency) in Solapur district. He was brother of former Deputy Chief Minister of Maharashtra Vijaysinh Mohite-patil. He was the Minister for Cooperation in the Shiv Sena-led state government in the late-90s under Narayan Rane as well as member of 13th Lok Sabha.

References 

1955 births
2015 deaths
People from Akluj
Bharatiya Janata Party politicians from Maharashtra
Maharashtra MLAs 1995–1999
India MPs 1999–2004
Lok Sabha members from Maharashtra
People from Solapur district